Juan Ignacio Londero (born 15 August 1993, in Jesus Maria) is an Argentine tennis player.

Londero reached his career-high ATP singles ranking of world No. 50 in November 2019 and his highest ATP doubles ranking of world No. 186 in March 2020.

Londero made his first appearance on an ATP World Tour in July 2013 when he lost in the first round of 2013 Claro Open Colombia against eventual champion Ivo Karlović.

He managed to win his first tour level match at the 2019 Córdoba Open against Nicolás Jarry and subsequently won his first ATP title at the tournament as a wildcard, defeating Guido Pella in the final.

He reached the fourth round of the 2019 French Open for the first time at a Major.

Performance timelines

Singles 
Current after the 2022 Chile Open.

ATP career finals

Singles: 2 (1 title, 1 runner-up)

Doubles: 1 (1 runner-up)

ATP Challenger and ITF Futures finals

Singles: 12 (6 titles, 6 runner–ups)

Doubles: 18 (7 titles, 11 runner–ups)

References

External links

1993 births
Living people
Argentine male tennis players
Sportspeople from Córdoba Province, Argentina
21st-century Argentine people